Margaret J. Schoeninger is an American anthropologist. She is Professor Emerita of Anthropology at The University of California San Diego, and until recently she was a Co-Director for the Center for Academic Research and Training in Anthropology, or CARTA. Her research is primarily focused on the evolution of the human diet and what this information can tell us about other aspects of human evolution.

Early life and education 
In 1970, Schoeninger received her B.A. degree in Anthropology from the University of Florida, and her M.A. degree in Anthropology from the University of Cincinnati in 1973. She then received her Ph.D. in Anthropology from the University of Michigan in 1980.

Contributions to anthropology 
Schoeninger is mainly interested in the changes that the human diet underwent through time and how diet has evolved in relation to other evolutionary changes. She researches this by looking at subsistence strategies and their anthropological connections. Schoeninger has published upwards of 60 research papers that investigate the isotopic ratios of various elements such as carbon, nitrogen, oxygen, and zinc in extinct primate dentition in order to reconstruct prehistoric human diet. Schoeninger has completed field research in North and Central America, Pakistan, India, Kenya, and Tanzania.

Awards and honors 
In 1990, Schoeninger was a Smithsonian Short Term Visitor in the Conservation Analytical Laboratory. In 1993 she was awarded the Faculty Development Award from the University of Wisconsin, and the following school year she was in the Vilas Associate Professorship at the same university. From 1997-1999, Schoeninger was recognized as a Distinguished Lecturer by the scientific research honor society Sigma Xi.  In 2007, Schoeninger was elected Fellow of the American Association for the Advancement of Science.

Selected publications 
 Jaouen, Klevia, Beasley, Melanie, Schoeninger, Margaret J, Hublin, Jean- Jacques, Richards, Michael P,  “Zinc isotope ratios of bones and teeth as new dietary indicators: results from a modern food web (Koobi Fora, Kenya)”.  Scientific Reports 6:26281, DOI: 10:103/srep 26281. 2016. http://doi.org/10.1038/srep26281
 Somerville, AD, Martin, MA, Walker, P,  Hayes, L, and Schoeninger, MJ  “Exploring patterns and pathways of dietary change: Preferred foods, dental health, and stable isotope analysis of hair from the Dani of Mulia, Papua, Indonesia”. Current Anthropology DOI: 58(1):31-56. 2017. https://www.journals.uchicago.edu/doi/full/10.1086/690142?mobileUi=0
 Schoeninger, MJ  “Diet reconstruction and ecology using stable isotopes”.  In: Larsen, C.S. (ed.) A Companion Volume to Biological Anthropology.  Wiley-Blackwell.  Chap. 25:445-464. 2010.  https://onlinelibrary.wiley.com/doi/abs/10.1002/9781444320039.ch25
 Schoeninger MJ.  “Dietary reconstruction in the prehistoric Carson Desert: stable carbon and nitrogen isotopic analysis”.  In: Larsen CS and Kelly RL (eds.) Bioarchaeology Of The Stillwater Marsh: Prehistoric Human Adaptation In The Western Great Basin.  American Museum Of Natural History, Anthropological Papers, Number 77, pp. 96–106. 1995. http://digitallibrary.amnh.org/handle/2246/260
 DeNiro MJ and Schoeninger MJ.  “Stable carbon and nitrogen isotope ratios of bone collagen: Variations within individuals, between sexes, and within populations raised on monotonous diet”. Journal of Archaeological Science 10(3):199-203. 1983.  http://doi.org/10.1016/0305-4403(85)90011-1
Gingerich PD and Schoeninger MJ.  “Patterns of tooth size variability in the dentition of Primates. American Journal of Physical Anthropology 51(3):457-465. 1979. https://onlinelibrary.wiley.com/doi/abs/10.1002/ajpa.1330510318

References 

Year of birth missing (living people)
University of Florida alumni
University of Cincinnati alumni
University of Michigan alumni
Fellows of the American Association for the Advancement of Science
Living people
American anthropologists
American archaeologists
Bioarchaeologists
American women anthropologists
Fellows of the American Academy of Arts and Sciences
American women archaeologists
American women scientists
21st-century American women